Kanchana Mendis, (born June 24, 1980 as කාංචනා මෙන්ඩිස්) [Sinhala]) is an actress in Sri Lankan cinema, stage drama and television. She is best known for the roles in movies Rajaya Sewaya Pinisai, Rosa Wasanthe and television serials Damini and Sakman Maluwa.

Personal life
Her father died when she was two years old. She is married to Roshan Ranawaka in 2009. The couple has two sons - Senuka Ryan, Nimana Rowen and one daughter Keisha Rayili. She currently lives in Detroit with her family.

Career
She became popular with the television advertisement Ninja Mosquito Coil along with Sanath Wimalasiri and Nimanthi Porage in 1998. She acted in the television serial Suba Anagathayak at the age of 12 directed by Dharmasena Pathiraja. She entered the mainstream film industry through the 2000 Sinhala film Rajaya Sewaya Pinisai directed by Udayakantha Warnasuriya with the character of a private secretary "Prabashwari". She has also appeared in a Tamil films named Varnajalam where the main roles were done by Sadha and Srikanth as well as in Kanagalal Kai Rasi. She also acted in few stage dramas such as Dharma Sangramaya by Saman Thushara and Ananga Bambaru by Richard Manawadu.

In 2003, Mendis was chosen as a "Brand Ambassador" for the special 40th anniversary lottery ticket from the Sri Lankan National Lotteries Board. During the same year, she won the Sumathi Tele award at Artscope for Most Popular Actress.

Selected television serials

 Akaradaruwa
 Ambu Daruwo
 Apooru Soladaduwa
 Athma Senehasa
 Bharyawo
 Bindena Benduma
 Bopath Sakkiya
 Dahas Gawdura
 Damini
 Dath Kekulu Pala
 Derana
 Deyyinge Kamaththa
 Doo Daruwo
 Fantasy Avenue
 Girikula
 Guru Geethaya 
 Hemanthaye Wasanthayak
 Indrachapa 
 Isuruyogaya
 Kinduru Nadiya
 Kulawanthayo
 Mahagedara
 Mahathala Hatana 
 Makaranda
 Mal Ethana
 Maya Mansala
 Me Wasantha Kaalayai
 Monaravila
 Nadeeladiya 
 Nethaka Maayavee 
 Pathini
 Pinibara Yamaya
 Ridi Duvili
 Sakman Maluwa
 Sanda Hiru Tharu
 Sandakada Thanna
 Sandaliya
 Sanda Maddahana
 Sanduni
 Sasandara 
 Sathipooja
 Sawsiri Uyana
 Sihina Wasanthayak
 Sinansenna Anuththara 
 Siri Dev Bawana
 Suba Anagathayak
 Sudu Mal Kanda
 Sujatha
 Suralova
 Therani Geethaya
 Wassanaye Hiru Evidin

Awards
She has won several awards at the local film festivals and television festivals. In 2000, she won the award for the Best Supporting Actress in the debut movie Rajaya Sevaya Pinisai at Presidential Awards. In 2001, she won a merit award for the role in Rosa Wasanthe at Sarasaviya Film Festival.

Presidential Film Awards

|-
|| 2000 ||| Rajaya Sevaya Pinisai || Best Supporting Actress ||

Sarasaviya Awards

|-
|| 2001 ||| Rosa Wasanthe || Merit Award ||

Sumathi Awards

|-
|| 2003 ||| ' || Most Popular Actress || 
|-
|| 2013 ||| Me Wasantha Kaalayai || Best Actress || 
|-
|| 2015 ||| Girikula || Best Actress || 

Raigam Tele'es

|-
|| 2012 ||| Me Wasantha Kaalayai || Best Actress || 
|-
|| 2015 ||| Girikula'' || Best Actress ||

Filmography

References

External links
 වත් පොහොසත්කම ඉදිරියේ මිලින වී ගිය ප්‍රථම ප්‍රේමය
 The darling of ‘Heart FM’
 පවුලක් වශයෙන් දෙපැත්තක ඉන්න මම කැමැති නැහැ - කාංචනා මෙන්ඩිස්
 Buddha’s life set to music

Living people
Sri Lankan film actresses
Sinhalese actresses
1980 births
Sri Lankan stage actresses
Sri Lankan television actresses